La Crosse is a city in and the county seat of Rush County, Kansas, United States.  As of the 2020 census, the population of the city was 1,266.  La Crosse proclaims itself the "Barbed Wire capital of the world.

History
La Crosse was founded in 1876, was named after the city of La Crosse, Wisconsin. La Crosse subsequently became the intended county seat, and county records were transferred there from the temporary county seat, nearby Rush Center. A county seat war ensued between the two communities, lasting until La Crosse was declared the permanent county seat and the construction of the county courthouse in 1888.

In the 1960s, La Crosse became a regional center of barbed wire collecting, leading to the establishment of the Kansas Barbed Wire Museum and the nicknaming of the city as "The Barbed Wire Capital of the World".

Tornado of 2012
On May 25, 2012, an EF-1 tornado caused about four blocks of significant damage, and two businesses were destroyed.  A third of the businesses sustained major damage.  No injuries were reported.

Geography
La Crosse is located at  (38.532014, -99.308614) at an elevation of 2,057 feet (627 m). Sand Creek, a tributary of Walnut Creek, flows southeast around the southwestern and southern portions of the city. Mule Creek, a small tributary of Sand Creek, flows southeast through the city.

Climate
On average in La Crosse, July is the hottest month, January is the coldest month, and May is the wettest month. The hottest temperature recorded in La Crosse was 115 °F (46 °C) in 1954; the coldest temperature recorded was -24 °F (-31 °C) in 1989.

Demographics

2010 census
As of the census of 2010, there were 1,342 people, 606 households, and 350 families residing in the city. The racial makeup of the city was 98.5% White, 0.2% African American, 0.4% Native American, 0.2% Asian, and 0.7% from two or more races. Hispanic or Latino of any race were 2.8% of the population.

There were 606 households, of which 24.9% had children under the age of 18 living with them, 44.2% were married couples living together, 8.7% had a female householder with no husband present, 4.8% had a male householder with no wife present, and 42.2% were non-families. 36.6% of all households were made up of individuals, and 18.5% had someone living alone who was 65 years of age or older. The average household size was 2.10 and the average family size was 2.72.

The median age in the city was 47.7 years. 19.9% of residents were under the age of 18; 4.9% were between the ages of 18 and 24; 21.3% were from 25 to 44; 27% were from 45 to 64; and 26.9% were 65 years of age or older. The gender makeup of the city was 47.3% male and 52.7% female.

2000 census
As of the census of 2000, there were 1,376 people, 585 households, and 367 families residing in the city. The racial makeup of the city was 98.33% White, 0.22% African American, 0.44% Native American, 0.15% Asian, 0.22% from other races, and 0.65% from two or more races. Hispanic or Latino of any race were 1.38% of the population.

There were 585 households, out of which 26.5% had children under the age of 18 living with them, 53.0% were married couples living together, 6.8% had a female householder with no husband present, and 37.1% were non-families. 33.5% of all households were made up of individuals, and 18.3% had someone living alone who was 65 years of age or older. The average household size was 2.20 and the average family size was 2.81.

In the city, the population was spread out, with 21.5% under the age of 18, 6.1% from 18 to 24, 21.8% from 25 to 44, 23.3% from 45 to 64, and 27.3% who were 65 years of age or older. The median age was 45 years. For every 100 females, there were 84.0 males. For every 100 females age 18 and over, there were 78.2 males.

The median income for a household in the city was $31,435, and the median income for a family was $39,118. Males had a median income of $26,118 versus $20,600 for females. The per capita income for the city was $17,264. About 7.1% of families and 9.7% of the population were below the poverty line, including 14.1% of those under age 18 and 11.6% of those age 65 or over.

Government
La Crosse is a city of the third class, according to state statute, with a commission-manager form of government. The city commission consists of the mayor and two commissioners, and it meets on the second and fourth Wednesday of each month.

Education
The community is served by La Crosse USD 395 public school district, and operates three schools in the city:
 La Crosse High School (9-12)
 La Crosse Middle School (7-8)
 La Crosse Elementary School (K-6)

Transportation
U.S. Route 183 runs north-south through La Crosse, intersecting Kansas Highway 4 (K-4) which runs east-west along the northern edge of the city.

Rush County Airport is located northeast of the city on the north side of K-4. Publicly owned, it has one asphalt runway and is used for general aviation.

A line of the Kansas and Oklahoma Railroad runs southeast-northwest through La Crosse.

Media

Print
One newspaper, The Rush County News, is published weekly in La Crosse.

Radio
The following radio stations are licensed to and/or broadcast from La Crosse:

FM

Television
La Crosse is in the Wichita-Hutchinson, Kansas television market.

Culture

Events
 Rush County Fair

Points of interest
 Kansas Barbed Wire Museum
 Post Rock Museum
 Historical Museum
 Nekoma Bank Museum
 Pleasant Point One-Room School Museum

See also
 List of United States tornadoes in May 2012

References

Further reading

External links

 City of La Crosse
 La Crosse - Directory of Public Officials
 History of Cities in Rush County
 La Crosse Info, Legends of Kansas
 La Crosse city map, KDOT

Cities in Kansas
County seats in Kansas
Cities in Rush County, Kansas
1876 establishments in Kansas
Populated places established in 1876